

France
 Malta – Claude-Henri Belgrand de Vaubois, Military Governor of Malta (1798–1800)

Portugal
 Angola – Miguel António de Melo, Governor of Angola (1797–1802)
 Macau – D. Cristovao Pereira de Castro, Governor of Macau (1797–1800)

Spanish Empire
Viceroyalty of New Granada – Pedro Mendinueta y Múzquiz, Viceroy of New Granada (1797–1803)
Viceroyalty of New Spain – Miguel José de Azanza, Viceroy of New Spain (1798–1800)
Captaincy General of Cuba –
 Juan Procopio Bassecourt y Bryas, Governor of Cuba (1796–1799)
 Salvador de Muro y Salazar, Governor of Cuba (1799–1812)
Spanish East Indies – Rafael María de Aguilar y Ponce de León, Governor-General of the Philippines (1793–1806)
Commandancy General of the Provincias Internas – Pedro da Nava, Commandant General of the Interior Provinces (1793–1802)
Viceroyalty of Peru – Ambrosio O'Higgins, Viceroy of Perú (1796–1801)
Captaincy General of Chile –
Gabriel de Avilés, Captain General of Chile (1796–1799)
Joaquín del Pino, Captain General of Chile (1799–1801)
Viceroyalty of the Río de la Plata –
Antonio de Olaguer y Feliú, Viceroy of the Río de la Plata (1797–1799)
Gabriel de Avilés, Viceroy of the Río de la Plata (1799–1801)

Kingdom of Great Britain
 Bermuda – George Beckwith, Governor of Bermuda (1798–1803)
 Cayman Islands – William Bodden, Chief Magistrate of the Cayman Islands (1776–1823)
 Ceylon – Frederick North, Governor of Ceylon (1798–1805)
 Madras – Edward Clive, Governor of Madras (1798–1803)
 Malta Protectorate – Alexander Ball, Civil Commissioner of Malta (1799–1801)
 New South Wales – John Hunter, Governor of New South Wales (1795–1800)

Colonial governors
Colonial governors
1799